USS PCE-872 was a  for the United States Navy during World War II. She was renamed Caribe (H 201) after being acquired by the Cuban Navy on 1 October 1947.

History
PCE-872 was laid down by Albina Engineer & Machine Works, Portland on 30 January 1943 and launched on 24 March 1943. She was commissioned on 29 November 1943.

On 24 July 1945, her alongside USS PC-803 and USS PC-804 scuttled the stricken destroyer escort USS Underhill after being hit by a kaiten launched torpedo from I-53. On 20 August of the same year, she was reclassified to PCEC-872.

After the war, she was transferred to the Foreign Liquidation Commission and later sold to Cuba and renamed Caribe (H 201) in the early 1950s. She was reclassified to (PE 201).

References

PCE-842-class patrol craft
1943 ships